LGT Group is the largest royal family-owned private banking and asset management group in the world. LGT, originally known as The Liechtenstein Global Trust, is owned by the princely House of Liechtenstein through the Prince of Liechtenstein Foundation and led by its royal family members H.S.H. Prince Max von und zu Liechtenstein (CEO) and H.S.H. Prince Philipp von und zu Liechtenstein (chairman).

Organization
LGT is headquartered in Vaduz, Liechtenstein, with a key presence in Zürich, Switzerland. The company maintains 3,405 employees in over 20 offices around the globe, Asia, Australia, Europe, the Middle East and North America.

LGT operates through several divisions:

 Private Banking - LGT Private Banking provides wealth management services to private clients
 Alternative Asset Management - LGT Capital Partners is an alternative investment manager, with around $60 billion of capital invested in investment funds, hedge funds and private equity investments
 Philanthropy and Impact Investing - LGT invests in social enterprises such as M-kopa through the LGT Venture Philanthropy Foundation and LGT Impact.

The company has made several acquisitions of high value transactions. In 2009, it acquired the Swiss operation of Dresdner Bank from Commerzbank, following this in 2015 it acquired more than $12 billion of HSBC Private assets and in 2017 it acquired Dutch giant ABN AMRO Asia Private with $20 billion in assets. The ABN AMRO transaction meant that LGT now had more assets under management in Asia than it did in Europe.

History
LGT Group traces its history back to 1920, when Bank in Liechtenstein (BIL) was founded with the objective to attract capital for the economic development of the Principality of Liechtenstein. In May 1921, BIL launched its operations with 10 employees based in ground-floor offices inside the main government building. During the global economic crisis in the 1930s, BIL and its shareholders were confronted with major problems, leading the Princely House of Liechtenstein to acquire a controlling interest in the bank.

Until the 1960s, the bank’s main focus was to support and provide financing for the expansion of Liechtenstein’s economy and business sector. BIL did so primarily through the provision of financial services and loans. Over time, however, the commercial opportunities available to it in the local economy became too narrow, leading it to grow its operations to become an international commercial bank. Following this transformation, BIL began to expand into various segments of the banking industry, with a particular focus on activities pertaining to mortgages, stock markets and foreign exchange.

In 1970, the bank's share capital was taken over by the recently established Prince of Liechtenstein Foundation. During the 1980s, BIL opened representative offices in Europe, the US and Asia, including in London, which was its first foreign business base, and in Hong Kong in 1986.

In 1986, BIL went public and in 1989, acquired GT Management PLC in London. In 1990, BIL GT Group AG was founded and H.S.H. Prince Philipp became Chairman of the Board of Directors. Six years later, BIL GT Group was renamed Liechtenstein Global Trust and BIL became LGT Bank in Liechtenstein AG. In 1998, the GT Asset Management division was sold and the bank went private. It was then that LGT decided to focus on private banking and asset management and to further expand its international operations.

In 2003, LGT acquired Schweizerische Treuhandgesellschaft STG from Swiss Life, opened LGT Bank Deutschland & Co. OHG and was granted a banking license in Singapore. Over the next four years, it launched LGT Bank Switzerland and opened LGT Bank Österreich. In 2006, H.S.H. Prince Max von und zu Liechtenstein became CEO.

LGT Venture Philanthropy, an independent charitable foundation, was founded in 2007, on the initiative of LGT CEO H.S.H. Prince Max von und zu Liechtenstein. In 2009, LGT sold its trust and fiduciary division (LGT Treuhand) to First Advisory Group and acquired the Swiss operation of Dresdner Bank. In 2011, it sold LGT Bank Deutschland & Co. OHG. In the years that followed, LGT opened a branch in Salzburg, Austria (2012), as well as LGT Middle East in Dubai (2013).

Between 2012 and 2017, LGT acquired several new portfolios and operations, including Clariden Leu’s ILS boutique (2012), a private banking portfolio from HSBC in Switzerland (2014), a majority stake in London-based wealth management partnership Vestra Wealth (2016), the private banking operations of ABN AMRO Asia in Asia and the Middle East (2016) and European Capital Fund Management (2017).

In 2019, LGT opened a branch in Thailand (LGT Securities Thailand) and also entered the Indian market through the acquisition of a majority stake in Validus Wealth (FDI approval pending). Later that year, the group acquired Aspada, a leading India-focused investment fund which was previously owned by the Soros Economic Development Fund (SEDF) as a sole shareholder, to expand its impact investing platform LGT Lightstone.

In December 2020, LGT group announced changes in its executive board. By 2021, Prince Maximilian of Liechtenstein assumed the chairmanship of the foundation board. Meanwhile, the former CFO of Private Banking took over the private banking branch as CEO. At the end of 2021, the current group structure will be dissolved.

In December 2021, LGT announced its agreement to acquire Crestone Wealth Management, a high net worth wealth management firm with approximately AUD$25 billion in client assets under management. The acquisition was completed in 2022.

Controversy

The German tax authorities commenced numerous audits and prosecutions for tax fraud in the tax haven of Liechtenstein, based on information on a compact disc acquired by the German secret service Bundesnachrichtendienst. The CD, containing large amounts of information on accounts held by German citizens and other nationals with the bank, was allegedly obtained for a sum of €4 million from a former employee or contractor of the bank. Information was also forwarded to many other European states and Australia, leading to successful investigations there. For its involvement in the affair, LGT agreed to settlement of with a fine of 50 million euros.

Rating
Rating: Standard & Poor's / Moody's (2017)

 A+ / Aa2

Locations

Europe
 Austria: Vienna, Salzburg
 France: Paris
 Germany: Frankfurt am Main
 Ireland: Dublin
 Liechtenstein: Vaduz
 Switzerland: Basel, Bern, Davos, Geneva, Lugano, Pfäffikon, Zurich
 United Kingdom: Bristol, London
 Jersey: St. Helier

Other locations
 Australia: Sydney
 Bahrain: Manama
 China: Beijing, Hong Kong
 Japan: Tokyo
 Singapore
 UAE: Dubai
 United States: New York City

External links 
Official Website

References

Financial services companies established in 1920
Banks of Liechtenstein
Banks established in 1920
Private banks
Private equity firms of Europe
Investment management companies of Liechtenstein
Organizations based in Vaduz
Brands of Liechtenstein